Syed Muzaffar Hussain was an Indian politician and agriculturist who served as a member of the 3rd and 7th Lok Sabha. A member of the Indian National Congress, he represented Bahraich parliamentary constituency in 1962 and 1980.

Biography 
He was born in October 1919 to Saiyid Ashraf Husain in Faizabad district, India. He received his education from Jameya Naimiya, Moradabad with Arabic, Urdu and Persian. He was previously associated with Republican Party of India. In 1954, he was appointed as secretary of All India Muslim Muttahada Mohaz, organizer of Republican Party of India for Uttar Pradesh unit in 1957. His last appointment was member of Committee on Petitions.

He was married to Mohammadun Nisa Bibi, with whom he had five children, including two daughters and three sons.

References 

1919 births
Year of death unknown
People from Faizabad district
India MPs 1962–1967
India MPs 1980–1984
Indian National Congress politicians from Uttar Pradesh